Mohammad-Ali Hosseinzadeh (21 March 1977 – 7 May 2016) was an Iranian principlist politician who was elected as the representative of Maragheh and Ajabshir electoral district in the 2016 Iranian legislative election.

2016 election
In the first round of the elections, the Principlists Grand Coalition listed no candidate in Maragheh and Ajabshir district because there were two Principlist candidates contesting each other, incumbent Mehdi Davatgari (supported by United Front of Principlists in 2012 election) and Mohammad-Ali Hosseinzadeh. The List of Hope chose to declare "silence", meaning they are not endorsing any candidate. People's Voice listed Davatgari, while Front of Prudence and Development supported Hosseinzadeh.

In the second round, List of Hope supported Davatgari.

Controversy 
On 27 April 2016, speaking in a meeting with construction workers of Maragheh at the city's Pasdaran square, he called himself soldier of the Supreme Leader and said: "Do not vote for capitalists. I'm not afraid of them. I'll bring them to you the way you can rape them...". "No one has the guts to say these things [that I'm saying, because] he will be given the hell, but I will take the the [sic] officials' pants off. No one can't say a word to me, because they know that anyone who breaks the law, [I] will give him hell...", "Let them kill us, they kill [me] and someone will replace  me. Let them eat shit!", he added. The markings was filmed with cellphones and vent viral on social media after he was elected.

Death 
At 5:45 am, 7 May 2016, Hosseinzadeh died in a car accident while driving his Peugeot Pars on the Qazvin–Zanjan road en route from his hometown to Tehran. According to Iranian Traffic Police officials, the car overturned because "the driver was sleepy". The other four passengers survived the accident.

References

1977 births
2016 deaths
University of Tehran alumni
People from Maragheh
Road incident deaths in Iran
Iranian elected officials who did not take office